

Merton Abbey Mills is a former textile factory in the parish of Merton in London, England near the site of the medieval Merton Priory, now the home of a variety of businesses, mostly retailers.

The River Wandle flowing north towards Wandsworth drove watermills and provided water for a number of industrial processes in Merton. Merton Abbey Mills were established by Huguenot silk throwers in the early eighteenth century; there were already textile works nearby from 1667.

Liberty & Co. had been involved with the site since the 19th century, as their popular ranges of fabrics for dress and furniture were nearly all made there by Littler and Co.  In 1904 Liberty & Co took over the Littler site.  They continued to operate the Merton Abbey Mills until 1972, and textile production was continued by other firms until 1982. During World War II part of the site was used to construct gun-turrets for the Bristol Blenheim fighter-bomber.

Today Merton Abbey Mills is a crafts market and the site of a summer theatre and music festival called Abbeyfest. A number of buildings from the Morris period, and even earlier, survive, and there are displays on the history of the site. A water-mill still turns in the summer, and the "colourhouse", a mid-18th century industrial building, is now a children's theatre. The water-mill and colour house are both Grade II listed buildings.

See also
 History of silk

Notes

References
Parry, Linda, Textiles of the Arts & Crafts Movement, Thames and Hudson, revised edition 2005,

External links
Merton Abbey Mills official site
Abbeyfest
Merton Priory Trust – full notes on the history and archaeology by David Saxby of the Museum of London

Textile arts
History of the London Borough of Merton
Morris & Co.
Grade II listed buildings in the London Borough of Merton
Tourist attractions in the London Borough of Merton